Damoh District is a district of Madhya Pradesh state in central India. The town of Damoh is the district headquarters. The district is part of the Sagar Division.

Demographics

According to the 2011 census, Damoh District has a population of 1,264,219, roughly equal to that of Estonia or the US state of New Hampshire. This gives it a ranking of 383rd in India (out of a total of 640). 
Its population growth rate over the decade 2001-2011 was 16.58%. Damoh has a sex ratio of 913 females for every 1000 males, and a literacy rate of 70.92%. 19.82% of the population lives in urban areas. Scheduled Castes and Tribes make up 19.49% and 13.15% of the population respectively.

At the time of the 2011 Census of India, 68.63% of the population in the district spoke Hindi and 30.27% Bundeli as their first language.

Economy 
In 2006, the Ministry of Panchayati Raj named Damoh one of the country's 250 most backward districts (out of a total of 640). It is one of the 24 districts in Madhya Pradesh currently receiving funds from the Backward Regions Grant Fund Programme (BRGF).

Places of interest 

The district has several places of historical importance. One example is the town of Nohta, which is located 21 km from Damoh on the banks of the Gauraya river. It was once a capital of the Chandela Rajputs and has many temples.

The ancient fort at Rajnagar village, 6 km from Damoh, was founded by the Mughals. Singhorgarh fort is another place of historical importance. It was built by Raja Vain Bason. Gond Rajas stayed in it for a long time. It was with Gond Raja Dalpat Shah and his Rani Durgawati at the end of 15th century. After the death of Raja Dalpat Shah, the Senapati of the army of Mughal emperor Akbar had a battle with Rani Durgawati at the village, Singrampur.

The town of Narsinghgarh, situated on Sonar River, has an ancient fort built by Shah Taiyab. Birla group has established a cement factory at Narsinghgarh. Kundalpur is famous place for Jain temples. Situated 32 km from Damoh, there are 58 Jain temples in Kundalpur.

The Jageshwarnath temple at Bandakpur is a Hindu pilgrimage center. In Damoh district the Lodhi and Kurmi are more powerful communities. Damoh city has a Ghantaghar, circuit house, statue of Maharana Pratap at Jabalpur Naka, Kirti Stambh, Gajanan pahadi, Naugaja pahadi, fort of Rani Damyanti Bai near tahsil ground, Nehru park and a Jatashankar temple.

Kundalpur (Sanskrit: कुण्डलपुर) is a historical pilgrimage site for Jainism in India. It is located in the central Indian state of Madhya Pradesh, 35 km from the city of Damoh. Jatashankar and Belatal temple is also an important pilgrimage site for Hindus. It is located near the collector residence and the district jail.

References

External links 

 Damoh District website

 
Districts of Madhya Pradesh